was a Japanese Kabuki actor and Living National Treasures of Japan. Tomijūrō work in Kabuki included the role of Musashibō Benkei, a Japanese warrior monk, in the drama, Kanjinchō. Outside Japan, Tomijūrō toured performed in the United States and Europe.

Tomijūrō was born Hajime Watanabe to Nakamura Tomijūrō IV and dancer, Tokuho Azuma. He made his theater debut in 1943 using the stage name, Bandō Tsurunosuke. In 1964, he became the sixth Ichimura Takenojō, another stage name. He further became the fifth Nakamura Tomijuro in 1972, succeeding his father's stage title.

In addition to Kabuki, Tomijūrō also appeared in film and television roles during his career. His film roles included Sharaku in 1995 and Gakko II in 1996. Tomijūrō's television credits included 1980's Shishi no Jidai (The Era of Lion) and the 1974 television series, Katsu Kaishū, based on the life of Katsu Kaishū.

Tomijūrō was named a Living National Treasures of Japan in 1994. He was inducted into the Japan Art Academy in 1996 and was further honored as a Person of Cultural Merit in 2008.

A native of Tokyo, Tomijūrō stopped performing Kabuki in November 2010 due to declining health. He died from rectal cancer at a hospital in Tokyo on January 3, 2011, at the age of 81. He was survived by a son, Nakamura Takanosuke, who was born in 1999, when Tomijūrō was 70 years old, and a daughter, born in 2003, when he was 74.

References

External links

1929 births
2011 deaths
Kabuki actors
Living National Treasures of Japan
Japanese male film actors
Japanese male television actors
Japanese male stage actors
People from Tokyo
20th-century Japanese male actors
21st-century Japanese male actors